Dizzy is the experiencing of dizziness, the state of being off balance. 

Dizzy may also refer to:

Fictional characters
 Dizzy Flores, from the Robert Heinlein book Starship Troopers
 Dizzy Gillespie Harrison, the protagonist in the 2002 teen film The New Guy
 Dizzy Tremaine, from the Disney Descendants franchise
 Dizzy Wallin, from the Gears of War video game series
 Dizzy, a character from the Guilty Gear video game series
 Dizzy, a character from Bob the Builder
 Dizzy, a character from Dark Oracle

Music
 Dizzy (band), a Canadian dream-pop band
 "Dizzy" (Goo Goo Dolls song)
 "Dizzy" (Tommy Roe song), a song that later became a hit in the UK for Vic Reeves and the Wonder Stuff

Other uses
 Dizzy (nickname), a list of people with the nickname
 Dizzy (series), a European video game series, or its lead character
 Dizzy – The Ultimate Cartoon Adventure
 5831 Dizzy, an asteroid

See also
 Dizi (disambiguation)
 Dizy (disambiguation)
 Dizzee Rascal, British rapper